Christos Zafeiris (born 23 February 2003) is a Norwegian footballer who plays as a midfielder for Slavia Prague.

Career
Born in Athens, Greece, Zafeiris moved to Norway at the age of 9. He started his senior career with Grorud in 2020. In August 2021, he signed a four-and-a-half-year contract with Haugesund. He was simultaneously loaned back to Grorud for the rest of the 2021 season. On 3 April 2022, he made his Eliteserien debut in a 3–1 loss against Sandefjord.

On 29 January 2023, Zafeiris signed for Czech First League leaders Slavia Prague on a four-and-a-half year deal.

References

External links

2003 births
Living people
Footballers from Athens
Greek footballers
Association football midfielders
Norwegian footballers
Norway youth international footballers
Greek emigrants to Norway
Norwegian people of Greek descent
Grorud IL players
FK Haugesund players
SK Slavia Prague players
Norwegian First Division players
Eliteserien players
Greek expatriate footballers
Expatriate footballers in the Czech Republic
Greek expatriate sportspeople in the Czech Republic